The Uzbekistan National Time Trial Championship is a road bicycle race that takes place inside the Uzbekistan National Cycling Championship, and decides the best cyclist in this type of race. The first edition took place in 1998, with the winner being Enver Setmemetov. The current champions are Aleksey Fomovskiy and Margarita Misyurina.

Multiple winners
Men

Women

Men

Women

References

External links

National road cycling championships
Cycle races in Uzbekistan
Time trial